The 2016–17 Jackson State Tigers basketball team represented Jackson State University during the 2016–17 NCAA Division I men's basketball season. The Tigers, led by fourth-year head coach Wayne Brent, played their home games at the Williams Assembly Center in Jackson, Mississippi as members of the Southwestern Athletic Conference. They finished the season 14–18, 10–8 in SWAC play to finish in a four-way tie for third place. As the No. 6 seed in the SWAC tournament, they lost to Southern in the quarterfinals.

Previous season
The Tigers finished the 2015–16 season 20–16, 12–6 in SWAC play to finish in third place. They defeated Prairie View A&M and Mississippi Valley State to advance to the championship game of the SWAC tournament where they lost to Southern. They received an invitation to the CollegeInsider.com Tournament where they defeated Sam Houston State in the first round to before losing to Grand Canyon in the second round.

Roster

Schedule and results

|-
!colspan=9 style=| Non-conference regular season

|-
!colspan=9 style=| SWAC regular season

|-
!colspan=9 style=| SWAC tournament

References

Jackson State Tigers basketball seasons
Jackson State